Wang Yu-chi is a Taiwanese politician. He was the Minister of the Mainland Affairs Council (MAC) of the Executive Yuan since 28 September 2012 until 16 February 2015, when he resigned over the dropping of espionage charges brought against Chang Hsien-yao. Wang is the first ROC ministerial-level government official to visit Mainland China after the end of the Chinese Civil War in 1949.

Education
Wang earned his bachelor's degree in law from the National Taiwan University (NTU). During his third year of university in NTU, he went to Singapore for the finals of the annual Asian varsities debate hosted by then Singapore Broadcasting Corporation. As a member of the NTU team, Wang argued persuasively against his group opponent from Nanjing University, saying that "mankind co-existing in peace is an impossible ideal". His team won. He then continued his master's degree in law from Indiana University in the United States.

ROC Mainland Affairs Council

Chinese leader photo ID test
In October 2012, after just less than a week after his appointment as the Minister, Wang was tested to identify Chinese leaders from the Politburo Standing Committee of the Communist Party of China by Tsai Chi-chang, member of the Democratic Progressive Party at the Legislative Yuan. He only managed to identify Hu Jintao and Xi Jinping, but failed to do so on the other seven leaders.

New PRC passport
After the issuance of new version of PRC passport in May 2012 which features Taiwan's iconic landmark of Sun Moon Lake and Chingshui Cliff along with China's iconic landmarks of Tiananmen Square and the Great Wall of China, Wang told the Strait Exchange Foundation had written to Association for Relations Across the Taiwan Straits in December 2012 to explain the matter, telling that this incident could harm the good development of cross-strait relations. Taiwan's response to this matter is however, the most lenient one than any other countries depicted in the passport.

New Taiwan Affairs Office director appointment
With the newly appointed Director of Taiwan Affairs Office of the State Council Zhang Zhijun in March 2013, Wang said that Zhang is welcomed to visit Taiwan at the appropriate time, suitable capacity and when all of the conditions are set right, because Zhang's predecessor Wang Yi never had the chance to visit Taiwan during his office term.

Cross-strait reciprocal representative offices
In mid April 2013, with the plan for Straits Exchange Foundation (SEF) branch office establishment in China and its counterpart Association for Relations Across the Taiwan Straits (ARATS) branch office establishment in Taiwan, Wang said the office will handle trade, consular affairs, cultural exchanges, protection and emergency assistance for Taiwanese residing in China. However, he emphasized that both SEF and ARATS offices are not official government office, and wish to avoid public misperception that Taiwan-China relations is a state-to-state relation.

He added that at the initial phase, Taiwan will set up three SEF branch offices in China, which are in Beijing, central China and southern China. The plan is to establish up to five SEF branch offices. As for ARATS branch offices in Taiwan, he won't allow Beijing to set up ARATS offices in all ROC administrative divisions.

In end of June 2013, when asked if Wang can open the proposed SEF offices in China, he said that as long as the Chinese authorities can address him with his formal ministerial title, then he has no problem with that, nothing that this is not a personal issue, but he is the formal appointed official by the government of the Republic of China, therefore he is representing Taiwan.

Taiwanese fisherman shooting incident
After the shooting incident of Taiwanese fisherman by Philippine government vessel on 9 May 2013 at the disputed water in South China Sea, Philippine President Benigno Aquino III said that this matter would be handled by Manila Economic and Cultural Office in Taipei in accordance to One-China policy. Wang responded that this dispute is between the Philippines and Taiwan. It has nothing to do with One-China policy at all.

Commenting on Beijing's expression of support to Taiwan because Taiwan is part of China, Wang thanked and appreciated them for the support and offer, but wish them to stay out of this dispute because it will make things more complicated if China were to be involved, MAC informed the Taiwan Affairs Office.

2013 cross-strait service trade agreement
Commenting on the recently signed Cross-Strait Service Trade Agreement between ARATS and SEF in Shanghai in end of June 2013, speaking at a forum in Hualien City, Wang said that the pact will help Taiwanese business people in reaching further to the Chinese market and it will greatly benefit Taiwanese doing business in China and that this pact will allow the Taiwanese there to stand at an advantage over other foreign competitors. He further added that the pact is an important components of the Economic Cooperation Framework Agreement and that every concession the Chinese authorities has made to the Taiwanese business is greater than those concessions made to other foreign countries.

Macau visit
In end of August 2013, Wang visited Macau, his first visit after taking office as Minister of MAC. During his visit, he met with the Chief Executive of Macau, Fernando Chui, the first time of such meeting between the two leaders. Both of them referred each other by their official title.

The two ministers discussed education and tourism issues. Chui raised the issue of when Taiwan will recognize school degrees issued in Macau, to which Wang responded positively. Wang also thanked the Government of Macau for the good treatment and respect he received while being in Macau since his arrival in Macau International Airport.

Wang also visited the Taipei Economic and Cultural Office in Macau for the first time since the ROC representative office was renamed to TECO, in line with the rest of ROC representative offices around the world, since 19 July 2011. He also visited Macau historic areas.

2013 APEC Indonesia
In October 2013, in a hotel lobby on the sidelines of the APEC Indonesia 2013 meetings in the Indonesian island of Bali, Wang met with Zhang Zhijun, a ground breaking historical meeting for the first time between leader of Taiwan Affairs Office and leader of Mainland Affairs Council, where the two addressed each other by each's official title. Both of them called on the establishment of a regular dialogue mechanism between their two agencies to enhance mutual understanding and facilitate cross-strait engagement. Wang was also invited by Zhang to visit China.

According to the MAC, by addressing each other by their ministerial title, both Wang and Zhang had shown "mutual non-denial" of each side's authority to govern and deepened mutual respect between them. President Ma Ying-jeou, through Presidential Office speaker, expressed his gratification, reiterating that the two sides do not deny each other's authority to govern. The Wang-Zhang meeting also marked a good start for normalizing official interactions across the Taiwan Strait.

Wang-Zhang meeting

On 11 February 2014, Wang met with Zhang in Nanjing, in the first official, high-level, government-to-government contact between the two sides since 1949. The meeting took place at Purple Palace Nanjing. Nanjing was the capital of the Republic of China during the period in which it actually governed mainland China. During the meeting, Wang and Zhang agreed on establishing a direct and regular communication channel between the two sides for future engagement under the 1992 Consensus. They also agreed on finding a solution for health insurance coverage for Taiwanese students studying in mainland China, on pragmatically establishing SEF and ARATS offices in their respective territories and on studying the feasibility of allowing visits to detained persons once these offices have been established. Before shaking hands, Wang addressed Zhang as "TAO Director Zhang Zhijun" and Zhang addressed Wang as "Minister Wang Yu-chi" without mentioning the name Mainland Affairs Council. However, Mainland China's Xinhua News Agency referred to Wang as the "Responsible Official of Taiwan's Mainland Affairs Council" in its Chinese-language news and as "Taiwan's Mainland Affairs Chief" in its English-language news.

On 25–28 June 2014, Zhang pays a retrospective visit to Taiwan.

Meeting with head of ARATS
On 27 February 2014, Wang met with Chen Deming, the President of ARATS, in Taipei. This is the first time meeting between the head of MAC and ARATS. Chen referred Wang as "Minister Wang". Wang said he looked forward to closely working with Chen. Chen also said that the recent Wang-Zhang Meeting in Nanjing would bring a better cross-strait relations.

View on cross-strait relations

Wang stated in March 2013 that his view on cross-strait relations is although both Taiwan and mainland China share a close relationship in terms of culture and ethnicity, in terms of democracy, human rights and the rule of law, the two have contrasting stances.

Commenting on the initiative of constitutions with different interpretations (憲法各表) for cross-strait relations between the DPP and the CPC put forth by former Chairman of the DPP  Frank Hsiehin mid April 2013, Wang explained that the initiative entails state-to-state relations and will not accepted by Beijing.

In early May 2013, Wang made a statement that if the PRC is willing to remove all of the missiles pointing at Taiwan voluntarily, it would be a gesture of goodwill which Beijing could show to Taipei, because it doesn't need cross-strait negotiation to carry out, only willingness on the part of mainland China. He added also that he wished to see exchange visits by leaders from both sides of the Taiwan Strait and in which both parties address each other using their formal official capacity.

In mid June 2013, Wang stressed the ROC government stance that the One-China policy they have been embracing is the Republic of China. As a sovereign and independent state, cross-strait relations is the relations between the two sides of the Republic of China, which are the Taiwan area and the Mainland area. The relationship is based on the 1992 consensus, that there is only one China, and that China is the Republic of China.

See also
 Cross-Strait relations
 Straits Exchange Foundation
 Taiwan Affairs Office

References

1969 births
Indiana University alumni
Living people
National Taiwan University alumni
Political office-holders in the Republic of China on Taiwan